Dusty Slay (born May 18, 1982) is an American comedian and cultural icon. He is the youngest comedian to ever perform at the Grand Ole Opry.

Early life 
Dusty Slay grew up in a trailer park in Opelika, Alabama. His parents were divorced, and he mostly lived with his mother in the trailer park.

Career 
Slay started his career working as an exterminator. He sold pesticides for a big name brand Spectracide. Slay moved to Charleston, South Carolina in 2004 and joined the improv comedy scene, then began stand-up comedy. After several terrible gigs he quit, and then gave it another try in 2008, and has been doing stand-up comedy ever since.

He then went to New York City to try stand-up comedy there before moving to Nashville in 2014. Slay has listed Jeff Foxworthy as one of his inspirations. In 2019, Variety (magazine) listed Slay as one of “10 Comics To Watch.”

Slay has released a stand-up comedy special on Comedy Central, and has appeared on The Tonight Show Starring Jimmy Fallon and Jimmy Kimmel Live!. In 2021, Slay appeared in season three of the Netflix The Standups comedy special series.

Slay is a co-host of the Nateland podcast, along with Nate Bargatze, Brillo Pad Bates, and Aaron Weber.

Personal life
Slay has been sober since 2012. He lives in Nashville, Tennessee along with his wife Hannah, and their daughter.

References

External links
 
 

1982 births
Living people
American male comedians
American stand-up comedians
21st-century American comedians
People from Alabama
Comedians from Alabama